Vincent Lee Chuan Leong (李泉梁 Lǐ Quánliáng) is a Singaporean ex-convict who, together with two illegal immigrants from China, kidnapped a 14-year-old female student in 1999. The trio abducted the teenager into their rented car, and then demanded S$500,000 ransom from the girl's father, a wealthy second-hand car dealer. Eventually, through negotiations, the ransom was lowered to S$330,000, and upon the agreement to the amount, the ransom was paid and the girl was subsequently released without harm.

Shortly after releasing the girl, Lee was arrested by the Singapore Police Force for kidnapping the teenager for ransom, and his two accomplices Shi Song Jing and Zhou Jian Guang, were also caught. Lee was found guilty of kidnapping by ransom and sentenced to life imprisonment. Both Shi and Zhou received the same sentence for the crime in a separate trial. After serving twenty years, ten months and nine days in jail, Lee was granted parole and is currently released from prison since 22 June 2020.

Personal life
Born in Singapore in 1966, Vincent Lee Chuan Leong was an academically-inclined student who used to study at the Presbyterian Boys' School before he went on to further his studies in university, and he earned a double degree in mathematics and finance. Upon his graduation, Lee worked as a marketing manager. Lee was a Christian and according to the pastor of the church Lee frequented to, he was known for his good character and participation to counsel troubled youth when they approached him for advice and help.

By August 1999, however, Lee was facing heavy financial trouble and potential bankruptcy from share trading, and to make matters worse, his wife, who was in the late stage of pregnancy at that time, required medical attention and the expensive medical fees also caused additional financial burden on Lee, who was desperate to discharge his debts and his wife's upcoming medical fees.

1999 kidnapping charge

Kidnap plot
Due to his desperation to pay off his debts, Lee decided to kidnap a girl for ransom, specifically a teenage girl who was the daughter of a rich family living in one of the affluent neighbourhoods in Bukit Timah. For his plan, Lee hired two illegal Chinese immigrants he met at a coffee shop near Hougang Plaza. One of the foreigners was 26-year-old Zhou Jian Guang (周建光 Zhōu Jiànguāng), a China-born native of Fujian Province, who was married with a five-year-old son, and he first came to Singapore to work as a construction worker in order to build a house for his parents, wife and son. Since July 1999, he lost his job but continued to stay in Singapore. The other was 29-year-old Shi Song Jing (施松进 Shī Sōngjìn), who came to Singapore from China in February 1997 due to him being duped about various well-paid jobs in Singapore. Shi was abandoned by his agent and he had to stay all alone in Singapore as a illegal immigrant for six months before getting a job as a plasterer. Both Zhou and Shi agreed to assist Lee in executing the kidnap plot.

Lee made a plan to abduct a target at Bukit Timah, starting with renting a van for the purpose of forcibly bringing their target into the van, and also rented a flat to use as their hideout and their place to confine the kidnap victim during the kidnapping. They also placed false license plates with false vehicle numbers on the van to avoid identification of their getaway vehicle.

Kidnapping of Sandi Yong
On the night of 9 September 1999, 14-year-old Sandi Yong Sze Hui (杨思慧 Yáng Sīhuì), a Secondary Two student of Monk's Hill Secondary School, was walking back home, wanting to celebrate her father's birthday, which fell on the same day she was kidnapped. Yong's father Yong Cher Keng (杨慈庆 Yáng Cíqìng) was a wealthy second-hand car dealer who resided at Sian Tuan Avenue in Bukit Timah. While on her way home, Yong was targetted by Vincent Lee and the two Chinese men, who abducted her and kept her inside her van. Subsequently, Yong was blindfolded and kept inside a bedroom, with her hands tied and her mouth covered with adhesive tape. During the time of her confinement, Yong was treated well and kindly by the trio, and she was not hurt.

After kidnapping Yong, Lee phoned Yong's father, asking for a ransom of S$500,000 in exchange for his daughter, threatening to harm the girl if he did not pay up. Yong's father reported the matter to the police, who helped monitor the situation while staying at the family's side to get updates about the case. A police operation was also set up with manpower invested full-time to search for Yong and identify the kidnappers. Yong's father and Lee later had two more phone conversations, and during each of the phone calls, Lee allowed Yong to talk to her father, and get updates that she was still safe and alright. Eventually, after some negotiations, it was agreed that Yong's father would pay a ransom of S$330,000 and upon payment, Lee would release the girl.

Yong's father, together with some police officers (who would secretly monitor the kidnappers' movements), went to the agreed location in Tampines during night time, where Yong's father would drop off a black bag containing the money, and Shi would collect the bag once Yong's father was out of sight. By then, the police had identified the kidnappers through Lee's credit card, which Lee used to purchase a prepaid phone card for contacting Yong's father.

After receiving the ransom money, on the morning of 12 September 1999, about 60 hours after her abduction, 14-year-old Sandi Yong was released by Zhou on Lee's orders, and she safely returned home after hailing a taxi. According to her parents in an April 2000 article, in the aftermath of Lee's trial for kidnapping, Yong remained traumatised and did not go outdoors much ever since the incident.

Arrest
Twenty minutes after the confirmation of the girl's release and safety, a team of police investigators, led by Inspector Richard Lim Beng Gee, arrested 33-year-old Vincent Lee at his Pasir Ris five-room flat for the kidnapping of 14-year-old Sandi Yong. Both Zhou and Shi were subsequently arrested at a flat in Telok Blangah Crescent. All three of them were charged with kidnapping for purpose of extorting a ransom. It was further revealed that Zhou and Shi entrusted the ransom money to five other illegal Chinese immigrants to help them to remit the ransom money out of Singapore. These five people were also arrested, charged and later jailed for dishonestly receiving stolen property; S$214,400 were recovered by the police.

Under Section 3 of the Kidnapping Act, if found guilty of kidnapping by ransom, Lee, Zhou and Shi would be sentenced to either life imprisonment or the death penalty, with caning optionally to be imposed if the offender receives life imprisonment. The trio were later additionally charged with the attempted kidnapping of another 14-year-old girl in March 2000.

The kidnapping of Yong was the first reported kidnapping case to occur in Singapore in a decade. The last case of kidnapping happened in April 1989, when 56-year-old goldsmith Phang Tee Wah was kidnapped by two men - 50-year-old Ibrahim Masod and 44-year-old Liow Han Heng - and later killed, and the men also attempted to extort ransom despite the death of Phang. Both men were sentenced to death for kidnapping and murdering Phang, though only Ibrahim would eventually be hanged at Changi Prison on 29 July 1994 while Liow died of a heart attack in August 1993 before he could be executed.

Trial proceedings

Plea of guilt and sentence
On 24 April 2000, 33-year-old Vincent Lee Chuan Leong first stood trial in the High Court for kidnapping 14-year-old Sandi Yong. By then, Lee submitted to the court his intention to plead guilty to the kidnapping charge. After receiving the plea, the High Court convicted Lee for kidnapping Yong for ransom.

Lee's defence lawyer, Edmond Pereira, argued in his submissions for sentence that life imprisonment should be the appropriate punishment for Lee. He highlighted that Lee's financial difficulties were the motivation for his planning and execution of the kidnap plot. He stated that Lee confessed to his crime from the start and stuck to his story, and he also provided full cooperation during police investigations and his willingness to be a key witness for the prosecution against his two accomplices Shi Song Jing and Zhou Jian Guang, who both pleaded not guilty and set to claim trial on a later date. Pereira also emphasised on Lee's regret for the crime, and he had treated Yong well while confining her at the rented flat, and never harmed her despite his verbal threats and the spontaneous targetting of the girl as a victim. The prosecution did not submit on sentence.

After hearing the representations from the defence, the trial judge, Judicial Commissioner (JC) Chan Seng Onn of the High Court agreed to the defence's position that the death penalty was inappropriate in Lee's case, given that Lee did not mistreat or harm Yong during her time in captivity, Lee's absence of a criminal record, Lee's full cooperation during investigations, and no presence of weapons used during the kidnapping, and the judge also noted that the prosecution did not seek the death sentence in Lee's case. In fact, JC Chan originally wanted to subject Lee to an additional six strokes of the cane besides a life term due to Lee's role as the mastermind, the trauma and distress he caused to Yong and her family, and Lee himself having "hatched this detestable criminal scheme to kidnap for ransom a young vulnerable schoolgirl" and recruited others to do the job, but the significant number of mitigating factors highlighted by Pereira in his "persuasive" mitigation plea made Justice Chan reconsider and hence declining to impose caning.

As such, JC Chan spared 33-year-old Vincent Lee Chuan Leong from both the gallows and cane, and hereby sentenced Lee to life imprisonment, the minimum punishment for kidnapping by ransom in Singapore. However, Lee appealed against his sentence, though the appeal was presumably rejected or withdrawn after it was filed.

At the time of Lee's sentencing, it was less than three years since the changes to the definition of life imprisonment under the law. Originally, on and before 20 August 1997, life imprisonment means a fixed jail term of 20 years in prison, and with good behaviour, an early release would be granted after serving at least two-thirds of the life sentence (13 years and 4 months). Due to the landmark ruling of Abdul Nasir Amer Hamsah's appeal on 20 August 1997, the interpretation of life imprisonment was changed to a term of incarceration for the rest of the convicted prisoner's natural life instead of 20 years in prison, and the new interpretation would apply to future crimes committed after 20 August 1997. Lee's crime took place in September 1999 and his life sentence was imposed in April 2000, hence his prison term would be equivalent to the remainder of his natural lifespan, with the possibility of parole after twenty years.

Fates of Zhou and Shi
The trial of Zhou Jian Guang and Shi Song Jing took place five days later in a separate courtroom, with another judge Judicial Commissioner (JC) Tay Yong Kwang hearing the case. Despite initially not pleading guilty, both Zhou and Shi chose to change their plea to guilt to kidnapping the 14-year-old girl for extorting the ransom. JC Tay sentenced both Zhou and Shi to life imprisonment on 29 April 2000, exactly the same sentence Lee received. Both men also did not receive caning, based on the facts that Yong was unharmed and treated well while in their captivity, as well as the legal principle of parity where an accomplice who played a more minor role than the mastermind cannot be subjected to a harsher penalty than the mastermind. Lee acted as a witness in the joint trial of the two Chinese men.

Both Zhou and Shi later appealed against the sentence. However, the Court of Appeal dismissed the appeals on 21 August 2000. Chief Justice Yong Pung How highlighted in the judgement that life imprisonment was the most lenient punishment for kidnapping under the laws of Singapore, and he also took to remind the pair that they would have been sentenced to hang if any harm had been done to the girl in the first place.

Imprisonment and release
After the end of his legal proceedings, Vincent Lee continued to serve his life sentence at Changi Prison, with his sentence backdated to the date of his arrest.

After serving 20 years, ten months and nine days, Lee, then 54 years old, was released on 22 June 2020, after the Life Imprisonment Review Board reviewed his conduct and decided that he be eligible for parole, provided that he never commit another crime outside prison while the parole order remains in force. Lee is currently working as a lorry driver.

A 2021 YouTube interview was filmed, with the producers speaking to Lee about his case and life after his release. During the interview and documentary, Lee continually expressed his regret for committing the crime, and he also spoke about some details of his life prior to and after his time in prison. Lee also revealed that during his final months of his imprisonment, he was transferred from Changi Prison to the Selarang Park Complex, where it prepared programmes for inmates who served long sentences to learn about the skills required in the outside world (eg. using a smartphone) and to gain adaptation and integration into the outside world. Several prison officers were also interviewed to speak about Lee's process of rehabilitation. The interview video was eventually set to private and only accessible to selected users.

Media effect
Kidnapping is extremely rare in Singapore. The rarity of such a crime also led to Lee's crime being brought into significant media attention in Singapore, and the kidnapping of Sandi Yong, together with four subsequent cases that took place within the next few years, was remembered as one of the high-profile kidnapping cases that ever occurred in Singapore in the past.

The case of Vincent Lee Chuan Leong was subsequently re-enacted by Singapore crime show Crimewatch, and the re-enactment aired on television as the eighth episode of the show's annual season in 2000, the same year when Vincent Lee, Shi Song Jing and Zhou Jian Guang were sentenced to life in prison for kidnapping Yong.

See also
 Chua Ser Lien
 Tan Ping Koon
 Kidnapping Act (Singapore)
 Life imprisonment in Singapore
 Capital punishment in Singapore
 List of kidnappings

References

1966 births
Living people
Life imprisonment in Singapore
1999 in Singapore
Kidnapping in Singapore
1999 crimes in Singapore
Singaporean criminals
Singaporean people convicted of kidnapping
Singaporean prisoners sentenced to life imprisonment
Prisoners sentenced to life imprisonment by Singapore
People paroled from life sentence
Violence against women in Singapore